The 2012 season was Chunnam Dragons' eighteenth season in the K-League in South Korea. Chunnam Dragons will be competing in K-League and Korean FA Cup.

Current squad

Out on loan

Transfer

In

Out

Coaching staff

Match results

K-League

All times are Korea Standard Time (KST) – UTC+9

League table

Results summary

Results by round

Korean FA Cup

Squad statistics

Appearances
Statistics accurate as of match played 27 June 2012

Goals and assists

Discipline

References

South Korean football clubs 2012 season
2012